The manga Bleach is written and illustrated by Tite Kubo. The plot starts with Ichigo Kurosaki, a teenager who accidentally steals the powers of the Soul Reaper Rukia Kuchiki and subsequently assumes her duties while she convalesces. Since that event, Ichigo has to fight Hollows, evil spirits of past humans that feed on unwary people.

The manga was first published in Shueisha's Weekly Shōnen Jump from August 7, 2001, to August 22, 2016. The 686 individual chapters were collected by Shueisha in a series of 74 tankōbon volumes between January 5, 2002, and November 4, 2016. Most chapter names are written in English and have katakana above them to indicate how they are read in Japanese, similar to the usage of furigana ruby characters with advanced kanji characters. The total count of published Bleach chapters and the number on the highest-numbered chapter do not match. This is because, in addition to the positive numbered chapters, some chapters are published with a negative or fractional chapter number. These "negative" chapters are side stories that involve events that precede the main plot of the series.

North American licensee Viz Media serialized the individual chapters in Shonen Jump from its November 2007 to April 2012 issues. The series moved to the digital anthology Weekly Shonen Jump Alpha in January 2012 and Viz Media published it digitally as Shueisha released new chapters in Japan. The first volume on English was released on April 19, 2004, and the last volume–the 74th–was released on October 2, 2018. The company released a hardcover "collector's edition" of the first volume with a dust jacket on August 5, 2008, followed by a box set on September 2, 2008, containing the first 21 volumes, a poster, and a booklet about the series. A second box set was released on July 7, 2015, containing volumes 22–48, the Bleach pilot and a  poster. A re-release of the series under the label of "3-in-1 Edition" started on June 7, 2011; as of March 5, 2019, all twenty five volumes have been released.

Viz Media released digital forms of the first 16 volumes in English on June 17, 2011. As of October 2, 2018, all 74 digital volumes have been published. On September 21, 2012, Shueisha released 45 digital volumes in Japanese e-book stores. As of November 4, 2016, all 74 digital volumes have been released.

Volume list

Volumes 1–21

Volumes 22–48

Volumes 49–74

3-in-1 Edition

Notes

References

External links
Official Bleach website 
Official Shonen Jump Bleach website